In its broadest sense, social vulnerability is one dimension of vulnerability to multiple stressors and shocks, including abuse, social exclusion and natural hazards. Social vulnerability refers to the inability of people, organizations, and societies to withstand adverse impacts from multiple stressors to which they are exposed. These impacts are due in part to characteristics inherent in social interactions, institutions, and systems of cultural values.

Because it is most apparent when calamity occurs, many studies of social vulnerability are found in risk management literature.

Definitions
"Vulnerability" derives from the Latin word vulnerare (to wound) and describes the potential to be harmed physically and/or psychologically. Vulnerability is often understood as the counterpart of resilience, and is increasingly studied in linked social-ecological systems. The Yogyakarta Principles, one of the international human rights instruments use the term "vulnerability" as such potential to abuse or social exclusion.

The concept of social vulnerability emerged most recently within the discourse on natural hazards and disasters. To date no one definition has been agreed upon. Similarly, multiple theories of social vulnerability exist. Most work conducted so far focuses on empirical observation and conceptual models. Thus, current social vulnerability research is a middle range theory and represents an attempt to understand the social conditions that transform a natural hazard (e.g. flood, earthquake, mass movements etc.) into a social disaster. The concept emphasizes two central themes:
Both the causes and the phenomenon of disasters are defined by social processes and structures. Thus, it is not only a geo- or biophysical hazard, but rather the social context that needs to be considered to understand “natural” disasters.
Although different groups of a society may share a similar exposure to a natural hazard, the hazard has varying consequences for these groups, since they have diverging capacities and abilities to handle the impact of a hazard.

Taking a structuralist view, Hewitt  defines vulnerability as being: ...essentially about the human ecology of endangerment...and is embedded in the social geography of settlements and lands uses, and the space of distribution of influence in communities and political organisation.
This contrasts with the more socially focused view of Blaikie et al. who define vulnerability as the:...set of characteristics of a group or individual in terms of their capacity to anticipate, cope with, resist and recover from the impact of a natural hazard. It involves a combination of factors that determine the degree to which someone's life and livelihood is at risk by a discrete and identifiable event in nature or society.

History of the concept
In the 1970s the concept of vulnerability was introduced within the discourse on natural hazards and disaster by O´Keefe, Westgate, and Wisner. In “taking the naturalness out of natural disasters” these authors insisted that socio-economic conditions are the causes for natural disasters. The work illustrated by means of empirical data that the occurrence of disasters increased over the last 50 years, paralleled by an increasing loss of life. The work also showed that the greatest losses of life concentrate in underdeveloped countries, where the authors concluded that vulnerability is increasing.

Chambers put these empirical findings on a conceptual level and argued that vulnerability has an external and internal side: People are exposed to specific natural and social risk. At the same time people possess different capacities to deal with their exposure by means of various strategies of action (Chambers 1989). This argument was again refined by Blaikie, Cannon, Davis, and Wisner, who went on to develop the Pressure and Release Model (PAR) (see below). Watts and Bohle argued similarly by formalizing the “social space of vulnerability”, which is constituted by exposure, capacity and potentiality (Watts and Bohle 1993).

Susan Cutter developed an integrative approach (hazard of place), which tries to consider both multiple geo- and biophysical hazards on the one hand as well as social vulnerabilities on the other hand. Recently, Oliver-Smith grasped the nature-culture dichotomy by focusing both on the cultural construction of the people-environment-relationship and on the material production of conditions that define the social vulnerability of people (Oliver-Smith and Hoffman 2002).

Research on social vulnerability to date has stemmed from a variety of fields in the natural and social sciences. Each field has defined the concept differently, manifest in a host of definitions and approaches (Blaikie, Cannon et al. 1994; Henninger 1998; Frankenberger, Drinkwater et al. 2000; Alwang, Siegel et al. 2001; Oliver-Smith 2003; Cannon, Twigg et al. 2005). Yet some common threads run through most of the available work.

Within society
Although considerable research attention has examined components of biophysical vulnerability and the vulnerability of the built environment
(Mileti, 1999), we currently know the least about the social aspects of vulnerability (Cutter et al., 2003). Socially created vulnerabilities are largely ignored, mainly due to the difficulty in quantifying them.

Social vulnerability is created through the interaction of social forces and multiple stressors, and it is resolved through social (as opposed to individual) means. While individuals within a socially vulnerable context may break through the "vicious cycle", social vulnerability itself can persist because of structural (i.e., social and political) influences that reinforce vulnerability. Social vulnerability is partially the product of social inequalities—those social factors that influence or shape the susceptibility of various groups to harm and that also govern their ability to respond (Cutter et al., 2003). It is, however, important to note that social vulnerability is not registered by exposure to hazards alone but also resides in the sensitivity and resilience of the system to prepare, cope, and recover from such hazards (Turner et al., 2003). However, it is also important to note, that a focus limited to the stresses associated with a particular vulnerability analysis is also insufficient for understanding the impact on and responses of the affected system or its components (Mileti, 1999; Kaperson et al., 2003; White & Haas, 1974). These issues are often underlined in attempts to model the concept (see Models of Social Vulnerability).

Models

Two of the principal archetypal reduced-form models of social vulnerability are presented, which have informed vulnerability analysis: the Risk-Hazard (RH) model and the Pressure and Release model.

Risk-Hazard (RH) Model
Initial RH models sought to understand the impact of a hazard as a function of exposure to the hazardous event and the sensitivity of the entity exposed (Turner et al., 2003). Applications of this model in environmental and climate impact assessments generally emphasised exposure and sensitivity to perturbations and stressors (Kates, 1985; Burton et al., 1978) and worked from the hazard to the impacts (Turner et al., 2003). However, several inadequacies became apparent. Principally, it does not treat the ways in which the systems in question amplify or attenuate the impacts of the hazard (Martine & Guzman, 2002). Neither does the model address the distinction among exposed subsystems and components that lead to significant variations in the consequences of the hazards, or the role of political economy in shaping differential exposure and consequences (Blaikie et al., 1994, Hewitt, 1997). This led to the development of the PAR model.

Pressure and Release (PAR) Model

The PAR model understands a disaster as the intersection between socio-economic pressure and physical exposure. Risk is explicitly defined as a function of the perturbation, stressor, or stress and the vulnerability of the exposed unit (Blaikie et al, 1994). In this way, it directs attention to the conditions that make exposure unsafe, leading to vulnerability and to the causes creating these conditions. Used primarily to address social groups facing disaster events, the model emphasises distinctions in vulnerability by different exposure units such as social class and ethnicity. The model distinguishes between three components on the social side: root causes, dynamic pressures and unsafe conditions, and one component on the natural side, the natural hazards itself. Principal root causes include “economic, demographic and political processes”, which affect the allocation and distribution of resources between different groups of people. Dynamic Pressures translate economic and political processes in local circumstances (e.g. migration patterns). Unsafe conditions are the specific forms in which vulnerability is expressed in time and space, such as those induced by the physical environment, local economy or social relations (Blaikie, Cannon et al. 1994).

Although explicitly highlighting vulnerability, the PAR model appears insufficiently comprehensive for the broader concerns of sustainability science (Turner et al., 2003). Primarily, it does not address the coupled human environment system in the sense of considering the vulnerability of biophysical subsystems (Kasperson et al, 2003) and it provides little detail on the structure of the hazard's causal sequence. The model also tends to underplay feedback beyond the system of analysis that the integrative RH models included (Kates, 1985).

Criticism
Some authors criticise the conceptualisation of social vulnerability for overemphasising the social, political and economical processes and structures that lead to vulnerable conditions. Inherent in such a view is the tendency to understand people as passive victims (Hewitt 1997) and to neglect the subjective and intersubjective interpretation and perception of disastrous events. Bankoff criticises the very basis of the concept, since in his view it is shaped by a knowledge system that was developed and formed within the academic environment of western countries and therefore inevitably represents values and principles of that culture. According to Bankoff the ultimate aim underlying this concept is to depict large parts of the world as dangerous and hostile to provide further justification for interference and intervention (Bankoff 2003).

Current and future research
Social vulnerability research has become a deeply interdisciplinary science, rooted in the modern realization that humans are the causal agents of disasters – i.e., disasters are never natural, but a consequence of human behavior. The desire to understand geographic, historic, and socio-economic characteristics of social vulnerability motivates much of the research being conducted around the world today.

Two principal goals are currently driving the field of social vulnerability research:
The design of models which explain vulnerability and the root causes which create it, and
The development of indicators and indexes which attempt to map vulnerability over time and space (Villágran de León 2006).

The temporal and spatial aspects of vulnerability science are pervasive, particularly in research that attempts to demonstrate the impact of development on social vulnerability. Geographic Information Systems (GIS) are increasingly being used to map vulnerability, and to better understand how various phenomena (hydrological, meteorological, geophysical, social, political and economic) effect human populations.

Researchers have yet to develop reliable models capable of predicting future outcomes based upon existing theories and data. Designing and testing the validity of such models, particularly at the sub-national scale at which vulnerability reduction takes place, is expected to become a major component of social vulnerability research in the future.

An even greater aspiration in social vulnerability research is the search for one, broadly applicable theory, which can be applied systematically at a variety of scales, all over the world. Climate change scientists, building engineers, public health specialists, and many other related professions have already achieved major strides in reaching common approaches. Some social vulnerability scientists argue that it is time for them to do the same, and they are creating a variety of new forums in order to seek a consensus on common frameworks, standards, tools, and research priorities. Many academic, policy, and public/NGO organizations promote a globally applicable approach in social vulnerability science and policy (see section 5 for links to some of these institutions).

Disasters often expose pre-existing societal inequalities that lead to disproportionate loss of property, injury, and death (Wisner, Blaikie, Cannon, & Davis, 2004). Some disaster researchers argue that particular groups of people are placed disproportionately at-risk to hazards. Minorities, immigrants, women, children, the poor, as well as people with disabilities are among those have been identified as particularly vulnerable to the impacts of disaster (Cutter et al., 2003; Peek, 2008; Stough, Sharp, Decker & Wilker, 2010).

Since 2005, the Spanish Red Cross has developed a set of indicators to measure the multi-dimensional aspects of social vulnerability. These indicators are generated through the statistical analysis of more than 500 thousand people who are suffering from economic strain and social vulnerability and have a personal record containing 220 variables at the Red Cross database. An Index on Social Vulnerability in Spain is produced annually, both for adults and for children.

Researchers have noted that social vulnerability may be shaped by communication-related factors. People may become more vulnerable if they have trouble accessing, processing, or reacting upon information about risks and hazards.

Collective vulnerability
Collective vulnerability is a state in which the integrity and social fabric of a community is or was threatened through traumatic events or repeated collective violence. In addition, according to the collective vulnerability hypothesis, shared experience of vulnerability and the loss of shared normative references can lead to collective reactions aimed to reestablish the lost norms and trigger forms of collective resilience.

This theory has been developed by social psychologists to study the support for human rights. It is rooted in the consideration that devastating collective events are sometimes followed by claims for measures that may prevent that similar event will happen again. For instance, the Universal Declaration of Human Rights was a direct consequence of World War II horrors. Psychological research by Willem Doise and colleagues shows indeed that after people have experienced a collective injustice, they are more likely to support the reinforcement of human rights. Populations who collectively endured systematic human rights violations are more critical of national authorities and less tolerant of rights violations. Some analyses performed by Dario Spini, Guy Elcheroth and Rachel Fasel on the Red Cross' “People on War” survey shows that when individuals have direct experience with the armed conflict are less keen to support humanitarian norms. However, in countries in which most of the social groups in conflict share a similar level of victimization, people express more the need for reestablishing protective social norms as the human rights, no matter the magnitude of the conflict.

Research opportunities and challenges
Research on social vulnerability is expanding rapidly to fill the research and action gaps in this field. This work can be characterized in three major groupings, including research, public awareness, and policy. The following issues have been identified as requiring further attention to understand and reduce social vulnerability (Warner and Loster 2006):

Research

1. Foster a common understanding of social vulnerability – its definition(s), theories, and measurement approaches.

2. Aim for science that produces tangible and applied outcomes.

3. Advance tools and methodologies to reliably measure social vulnerability.

Public awareness

4. Strive for better understanding of nonlinear relationships and interacting systems (environment, social and economic, hazards), and present this understanding coherently to maximize public understanding.

5. Disseminate and present results in a coherent manner for the use of lay audiences. Develop straight forward information and practical education tools.

6. Recognize the potential of the media as a bridging device between science and society.

Policy

7. Involve local communities and stakeholders considered in vulnerability studies.

8. Strengthen people's ability to help themselves, including an (audible) voice in resource allocation decisions.

9. Create partnerships that allow stakeholders from local, national, and international levels to contribute their knowledge.

10. Generate individual and local trust and ownership of vulnerability reduction efforts.

Debate and ongoing discussion surround the causes and possible solutions to social vulnerability. In cooperation with scientists and policy experts worldwide, momentum is gathering around practice-oriented research on social vulnerability. In the future, links will be strengthened between ongoing policy and academic work to solidify the science, consolidate the research agenda, and fill knowledge gaps about causes of and solutions for social vulnerability.

See also
Disadvantaged
Vulnerability index
Vulnerability assessment

References

Notes

Sources
Bankoff, G. (2003). Cultures of Disaster: Society and natural hazards in the Philippines. London, RoutledgeCurzon.
Blaikie, P., T. Cannon, I. Davis & B. Wisner. (1994). At Risk: Natural hazards, People's vulnerability, and disasters. London, Routledge.
Cannon, T., J. Twigg, et al. (2005). Social Vulnerability, Sustainable Livelihoods and Disasters, Report to DFID Conflict and Humanitarian Assistance Department (CHAD) and Sustainable Livelihoods Support Office. London, DFID: 63.
Chambers, R. (1989). "Editorial Introduction: Vulnerability, Coping and Policy." IDS Bulletin 20(2): 7.
Chavez-Alvarado, R.; Sanchez-Gonzalez, D. (2016). "Vulnerable aging in flooded households and adaptation to climate change in cities in Latin America: the case of Monterrey", Papeles de Poblacion 22(90), 9-42.

Frankenberger, T. R., M. Drinkwater, et al. (2000). Operationalizing household livelihood security: a holistic approach for addressing poverty and vulnerability. Forum on Operationalising Sustainable Livelihoods Approaches. Pontignano (Siena), FAO.
Henninger, N. (1998). Mapping and Geographic Analysis of Human Welfare and Poverty: Review and Assessment. Washington DC, World Resources Institute.
Hewitt, K., Ed. (1983). Interpretation of Calamity: From the Viewpoint of Human Ecology. Boston, Allen.
Hewitt, K. (1997). Regions of Risk: A Geographical Introduction to Disasters. Essex, Longman.

Oliver-Smith, A. and S. M. Hoffman (2002). Theorizing Disasters: Nature, Power and Culture. Theorizing Disasters: Nature, Power and Culture (Catastrophe and Culture: The Anthropology of Disaster). A. Oliver-Smith. Santa Fe, School of American Research Press.

Villágran de León, J. C. (2006). "Vulnerability Assessment in the Context of Disaster-Risk, a Conceptual and Methodological Review."
Warner, K. and T. Loster (2006). A research and action agenda for social vulnerability. Bonn, United Nations University Institute of Environment and Human Security.

Wisner, B, Blaikie, P., T. Cannon, Davis, I. (2004). At Risk: Natural hazards, people's vulnerability and disasters. 2nd edition, London, Routledge.

Further reading
Overview
Adger, W. Neil. 2006. Vulnerability. Global Environmental Change 16 (3):268-281.
Cutter, Susan L., Bryan J. Boruff, and W. Lynn Shirley. 2003. Social vulnerability to environmental hazards. Social Science Quarterly 84 (2):242-261.
Gallopín, Gilberto C. 2006. Linkages between vulnerability, resilience, and adaptive capacity. Global Environmental Change 16 (3):293-303.
Oliver-Smith, Anthony. 2004. Theorizing vulnerability in a globalized world: a political ecological perspective. In Mapping vulnerability: disasters, development & people, edited by G. Bankoff, G. Frerks and D. Hilhorst. Sterling, VA: Earthscan, 10–24.

Natural hazards paradigm
Burton, Ian, Robert W. Kates, and Gilbert F. White. 1993. The environment as hazard. 2nd ed. New York: Guildford Press.
Kates, Robert W. 1971. Natural hazard in human ecological perspectives: hypotheses and models. Economic Geography 47 (3):438-451.
Mitchell, James K. 2001. What's in a name?: issues of terminology and language in hazards research (Editorial). Environmental Hazards 2:87-88.

Political-ecological tradition
Blaikie, Piers, Terry Cannon, Ian Davis and Ben Wisner. 1994. At risk: natural hazards, people's vulnerability, and disasters. ist ed. London: Routledge. (see below under Wisner for 2nd edition)
Bohle, H. G., T. E. Downing, and M. J. Watts. 1994. Climate change and social vulnerability: the sociology and geography of food insecurity. Global Environmental Change 4:37-48.

Langridge, R.; J. Christian-Smith; and K.A. Lohse. "Access and Resilience: Analyzing the Construction of Social Resilience to the Threat of Water Scarcity" Ecology and Society 11(2): insight section.
O'Brien, P., and Robin Leichenko. 2000. Double exposure: assessing the impacts of climate change within the context of economic globalization. Global Environmental Change 10 (3):221-232.
Quarantelli, E. L. 1989. Conceptualizing disasters from a sociological perspective. International Journal of Mass Emergencies and Disasters 7 (3):243-251.
Sarewitz, Daniel, Roger Pielke, Jr., and Mojdeh Keykhah. 2003. Vulnerability and risk: some thoughts from a political and policy perspective. Risk Analysis 23 (4):805-810.
Tierney, Kathleen J. 1999. Toward a critical sociology of risk. Sociological Forum 14 (2):215-242.
Wisner, B., Blaikie, Piers, Terry Cannon, Ian Davis. 2004. At risk: natural hazards, people's vulnerability, and disasters. 2nd ed. London: Routledge.

Human-ecological tradition
Brooks, Nick, W. Neil Adger, and P. Mick Kelly. 2005. The determinants of vulnerability and adaptive capacity at the national level and the implications for adaptation. Global Environmental Change 15 (2):151-163.
Comfort, L., Ben Wisner, Susan L. Cutter, R. Pulwarty, Kenneth Hewitt, Anthony Oliver-Smith, J. Wiener, M. Fordham, W. Peacock, and F. Krimgold. 1999. Reframing disaster policy: the global evolution of vulnerable communities. Environmental Hazards 1 (1):39-44.
Cutter, Susan L. 1996. Vulnerability to environmental hazards. Progress in Human Geography 20 (4):529-539.
Dow, Kirsten. 1992. Exploring differences in our common future(s): the meaning of vulnerability to global environmental change. Geoforum 23:417-436.
Liverman, Diana. 1990. Vulnerability to global environmental change. In Understanding global environmental change: the contributions of risk analysis and management, edited by R. E. Kasperson, K. Dow, D. Golding and J. X. Kasperson. Worcester, MA: Clark University, 27–44.
Peek, L., & Stough, L. M. (2010). Children with disabilities in the context of disaster: A social vulnerability perspective. Child Development, 81(4), 1260–1270.

Research Needs
Cutter, Susan L. 2001. A research agenda for vulnerability science and environmental hazards [Internet]. International Human Dimensions Programme on Global Environmental Change [cited August 18, 2006]. Available from https://web.archive.org/web/20070213050141/http://www.ihdp.uni-bonn.de/html/publications/publications.html.

External links
Social Vulnerability in Spain (applied research based on a set of indicators which cover the muldimensional aspects of social vulnerability, by means of a database specifically designed by the Spanish Red Cross- information in Spanish, executive summaries available also in English language)
Hazard Reduction and Recovery Center, Texas A&M University
Hazards and Vulnerability Research Institute, University of South Carolina
Livelihoods and Institutions Group, Natural Resources Institute
Munich Re Foundation
National University of Colombia, Working Group on Disaster Management
Radical Interpretations of Disaster (RADIX)
Social protection, International Labour Organization
Social protection, World Bank
Nations University’s Institute for Environment & Human Security
Understanding Katrina: Perspectives from the Social Sciences
Vulnerability Net
Centers For Disease Control and Prevention - Social Vulnerability Index: Ranking all U.S tracts using 15 Census and American Community Survey indicators
 Dídac Sánchez Foundation

Vulnerability
Sociological terminology